The 2013 Winmau World Masters was a major tournament on the BDO/WDF calendar for 2013. It took place from 10–13 October, with 10 October play at the Bonus Arena for the non-stage matches, and 11–13 October play at the Hull City Hall, which hosted the stage element of the event for the third year.

Stephen Bunting and Julie Gore both attempted to defend the titles they won in 2012.  Bunting was the top seed for the Men's competition after a successful year on the circuit, whilst Gore was third seed. Bunting successfully defended his title without dropping a set.  In the women's event Gore was beaten in the last 16 by Maud Jackson. Deta Hedman beat Rachel Brooks 4–1 in the final.

Seeds

Men

These are finalised on completion of the 2013 French Open on 31 August – 1 September. For the second consecutive year, there are 32 seeds (an increase from 8 between 2007–2011) with the Top 16 exempt until the Last 32 stage.

  Stephen Bunting
  James Wilson
  Scott Waites
  Darryl Fitton
  Jeffrey de Graaf
  Tony O'Shea
  Geert De Vos
  Remco van Eijden
  Glen Durrant
  Jan Dekker
  Robbie Green
  Martin Atkins
  Gary Robson
  Ross Montgomery
  Richie George
  Wesley Harms
  Jim Williams
  Scott Mitchell
  Paul Jennings
  Benito van de Pas
  Alan Norris
  Rick Hofstra
  Tony Eccles
  Willy van de Wiel
  Ron Meulenkamp
  Jimmy Hendriks
  John Walton
  Garry Thompson
  Sam Head
  Michel van der Horst
  Martin Adams
  Tom Gregory
19th seed Paul Jennings did not attend.

Women

These are finalised on completion of the 2013 French Open on 31 August – 1 September. The ladies seeds enter at the start of the competition however can not play each other until the quarter final stage.

  Deta Hedman
  Trina Gulliver
  Julie Gore
  Anastasia Dobromyslova
  Fallon Sherrock
  Rachel Brooks
  Aileen de Graaf
  Irina Armstrong

There are no seedings in the boys or girls events.

Men's Draw

Last 32 onwards.

Sets are best of 3 legs.

Ladies Draw

Last 8 onwards.

Boys Draw

Last 8 onwards.

Girls Draw

Last 8 onwards.

Television coverage
Eurosport are scheduled to show the final session of play of the event across Europe.

References

World Masters (darts)
World Masters
World Masters (darts)
Sport in Kingston upon Hull
2010s in Kingston upon Hull